Nowa Szarlejka  is a village situated in the administrative district of Gmina Wręczyca Wielka, within Kłobuck County, Silesian Voivodeship, in southern Poland.

The village has a population of 197.

References

Nowa Szarlejka